The West Indies cricket team toured Pakistan in December 2021 to play three One Day International (ODI) and three Twenty20 International (T20I) matches. The ODI series would have formed part of the inaugural 2020–23 ICC Cricket World Cup Super League. The fixtures for the tour were confirmed in November 2021. Prior to the tour, the West Indies women's team also toured Pakistan to play three matches.

During the T20I series, multiple cases of COVID-19 were confirmed in the West Indies team and support staff. Despite the T20I matches going ahead as planned, both cricket boards agreed to postpone the ODI series until June 2022.

Kieron Pollard was ruled out of the tour due to an injury he suffered at the 2021 ICC Men's T20 World Cup. Shai Hope and Nicholas Pooran were named as the captains of the West Indies' ODI and T20I squads respectively in Pollard's absence.

Pakistan won the first T20I match by 63 runs. It was their 18th win in the format in 2021, the most by any team in a single calendar year. Pakistan won the second T20I by nine runs, winning the series with one match to play. Pakistan also won the third T20I, by seven wickets, to win the series 3–0. Pakistan's Mohammad Rizwan became the first batter to score 2,000 runs in Twenty20 cricket in a calendar year.

Squads

Abdullah Shafique was named as a reserve player in Pakistan's squad. Kieron Pollard was ruled out of the tour due to a hamstring injury, with Devon Thomas and Rovman Powell being named as replacements in the West Indies' ODI and T20I squads respectively. Sheldon Cottrell, Roston Chase and Kyle Mayers were all ruled out of the West Indies' squad for the T20I matches after testing positive for COVID-19. Ahead of the third T20I, Shai Hope, Akeal Hosein and Justin Greaves of the West Indies all tested positive for COVID-19, ruling them out of the series.

T20I series

1st T20I

2nd T20I

3rd T20I

ODI series

1st ODI

2nd ODI

3rd ODI

References

External links
Series home at ESPN Cricinfo

2021 in Pakistani cricket
2021 in West Indian cricket
International cricket competitions in 2021–22
West Indian cricket tours of Pakistan
Cricket events curtailed due to the COVID-19 pandemic